Abstract labour and concrete labour refer to a distinction made by Karl Marx in his critique of political economy. It refers to the difference between human labour in general as economically valuable worktime versus human labour as a particular activity that has a specific useful effect within the (capitalist) mode of production.

Overview 
As economically valuable worktime, human labour is spent to add value to products or assets (thereby conserving their capital value, and/or transferring value from inputs to outputs). In this sense, labour is an activity which creates/maintains economic value pure and simple, which could be realized as a sum of money once labour's product is sold or acquired by a buyer. The value-creating ability of labour is most clearly visible when all labour is stopped. If all labour is withdrawn, the value of the capital assets worked with will normally deteriorate, and in the end, if labour is permanently withdrawn, nothing will be left except a ghost town situation.
As a useful activity of a particular kind, human labour can have a useful effect in producing particular tangible products which are used by others, or by the producers themselves. In this sense, labour is an activity which creates use-values, i.e. tangible products, results or effects which can be used or consumed. The creation of use-values is highlighted, when goods and services of poor quality are created, which are not supplied on time and mainly useless to the consumer. Labour must be applied to produce usable products, regardless of how much they are sold for, otherwise there are no use-values. If labour produces useless products or results, it is simply a waste of labour-time.

So, Marx argues that human work is both (1) an activity which, by its useful effect, helps to create particular kinds of products, and (2) in an economic sense a value-forming activity that, if it is productively applied, can help create more value than there was before. If an employer hires labour, the employer thinks both about the value that the labour can add within his business, and about how useful the labour service will be for his business operations. That is, the right kind of work not only needs to get done, but it needs to get done in a way that it helps the employer to make money.

If the labour makes no net addition to new value produced, then the employer makes no money from it, and the labour will be only an expense to him. If the labour is only a net expense (overhead), then it is commercially speaking unproductive labour. Yet it may be very necessary to employ this unproductive labour, if, without its performance, considerable capital value would be lost from the employer's financial investments, or if business would fail without it. That is, labour may be very necessary to maintain capital value, even if it does not actually add value to capital, and does not directly add to net profit. So, the employer also buys unproductive labour because the employer's costs in this respect are lower than the loss of value that would occur, if he did not employ unproductive labour to maintain capital value, and to prevent loss of capital value. For example, cleaning work might seem a very menial and low-value activity, but if business equipment fails, customers stay away, and the staff get sick or hurt, it costs the business a lot of extra money. 

However, Marx posited abstract labor, all labor-power, as homogeneous, productive labor due to the social nature of value. Labor power, whether managerial or otherwise, when exchanged directly with capital, is included in any calculation of the average socially necessary labor time for production of a specific commodity, and is still represented by variable capital and therefore value adding capital.

Origin

In the introduction to his Grundrisse manuscript, Marx argued that the category of abstract labour "expresses an ancient relation existing in all social formations"; but, he continued, only in modern bourgeois society (exemplified by the United States) is abstract labour fully realized in practice. Because only there does a system of price-equations exist within a universal market, which can practically reduce the value of all forms and quantities of labour uniformly to sums of money, so that any kind of labour becomes an interchangeable, tradeable good or "input" with a known price tag – and is also practically treated as such. In the Grundrisse, Marx also distinguished between "particular labour" and "general labour", contrasting communal production with production for exchange.

Marx published about the categories of abstract and concrete labour for the first time in A Contribution to the Critique of Political Economy (1859)  and they are discussed in more detail in chapter 1 of Capital, Volume I, where Marx writes:

Abstract labour and exchange
Marx himself considered that all economising reduced to the economical use of human labour-time; "to economise" ultimately meant saving on human energy and effort.

However, according to Marx, the achievement of abstract thinking about human labour, and the ability to quantify it, is closely related to the historical development of economic exchange in general, and more specifically commodity trade (the trade in wares and merchandise).

The expansion of trade requires the ability to measure and compare all kinds of things, not just length, volume and weight, but also time itself. Originally, the units of measurement used were taken from everyday life—the length of a finger or limb, the volume of an ordinary container, the weight one can carry, the duration of a day or a season, the number of cattle. Socially standardized measurement units began to be used probably from circa 3000 BC onwards in ancient Egypt and Mesopotamia, and then state authorities began to supervise the use of measures, with rules to prevent cheating. Once standard measuring units existed, mathematics could begin to develop.

In fact, Marx argues the abstraction of labour in thought is the reflex of a real process, in which commercial trade in products not only alters the way labour is viewed, but also how it is practically treated. In other words, when labour becomes a commercial object traded in the marketplace, then the form and content of work in the workplace will be transformed as well. This transformation is practically possible, because labour already contains the potential to adapt to the requirements of capitalist business. This potential has already been shaped up by previous schooling and training.

If different products are exchanged in market trade according to specific trading ratios, Marx argues, the exchange process at the same time relates, values and commensurates the quantities of human labour expended to produce those products, regardless of whether the traders are consciously aware of that (see also value-form).

Therefore, Marx implies, the exchange process itself involves the making of a real abstraction, namely abstraction from (or indifference to) the particular characteristics of concrete (specific) labour that produced the commodities whose value is equated in trade. At first, the relationship between quantities of traded commodities symbolically represents the relative costs in labour time. Next, money-prices begin to represent symbolically the commodities being traded. In this way, a system of symbolic representation emerges which can facilitate the exchange of the most diverse products with great efficiency. In the end, commodities become simply objects of value, and since their value can rise and fall, they can be bought and sold purely for capital gain. Closely related to this, is the growth of a cash economy, and Marx claims that:

In a more complex division of labour, it becomes difficult or even impossible to equate the value of all different labour-efforts directly. But money enables us to express and compare the value of all different labour-efforts—more or less accurately—in money-units (initially, quantities of gold, silver, or bronze). Marx then argues that labour viewed concretely in its specifics creates useful things, but labour-in-the-abstract is value-forming labour, which conserves, transfers and/or creates economic value (see Valorisation). In 1844, Marx said that:

In the feudal society of medieval Europe, Marx comments,

Abstract labour and capitalism

If the production process itself becomes organised as a specifically capitalist production process, then the abstraction process is deepened, because production labour itself becomes directly treated and organised in terms of its commercial exchange value, and in terms of its capacity to create new value for the buyer of that labour.

Quite simply, in this case, a quantity of labour-time is equal to a quantity of money, and it can be calculated that X hours of labour—regardless of who in particular performs them—create, or are worth, Y amounts of new product value. In this way, labour is practically rendered abstract.

The abstraction is completed when a labour market is established which very exactly quantifies the money-price applying to all kinds of different occupational functions, permitting equations such as:

x amount of qualified labour = y amounts of unskilled labour = z number of workers = p amount of money = q amount of goods.

This is what Marx calls a value relationship ("Wertverhältnis" in German). It can also be calculated that it costs a certain amount of time and money to train a worker to perform a certain task, and how much value that adds to the workers' labour, giving rise to the notion of human capital.

As a corollary, in these conditions workers will increasingly treat the paid work they do as something distinct or separate from their personality, a means to an end rather than an end in itself. Work becomes "just work", it no longer necessarily says anything at all about the identity, creativity or personality of the worker. With the development of an average skill level in the workforce, the same job can also be done by many different workers, and most workers can do many different jobs; nobody is necessarily tied to one type of work all his life anymore. Thus we can talk of "a job" as an abstract function that could be filled by anybody with the required skills. Managers can calculate that with a certain budget, a certain number of paid working hours are required or available to do the work, and then divide up the hours into different job functions to be filled by suitably qualified personnel.

Marx's theory of alienation considers the human and social implications of the abstraction and commercialization of labour. His concept of reification reflects about the inversions of object and subject, and of means and ends, which are involved in commodity trade.

Marx regarded the distinction between abstract and concrete labour as being among the most important innovations he contributed to the theory of economic value, and subsequently Marxian scholars have debated a great deal about its theoretical significance.

Evolutionary or historically specific

For some, abstract labour is an economic category which applies only to the capitalist mode of production, i.e. it applies only, when human labour power or work-capacity is universally treated as a commodity with a certain monetary cost or earnings potential. Thus Professor John Weeks claims that

Other Marx-scholars, such as Makoto Itoh, take a more evolutionary view. They argue that the abstract treatment of human labour-time is something that evolved and developed in the course of the whole history of trade, or even precedes it, to the extent that primitive agriculture already involves attempts to economise labour, by calculating the comparative quantities of labour-time involved in producing different kinds of outputs.

In this sense, Marx argued in his book A Contribution to the Critique of Political Economy (1859) that

However in the same writing he also says

Throughout the writing he never ceases to say that abstract labour is "universal" and strictly manifests itself as social labour, not existing in small isolation. Marx repeats this point in Capital Volume 1 (1867) implying that abstract labour arises only when products are produced solely as commodities, something limited strictly to the capitalist mode of production:

Skilled labour

Another controversy concerns the differences between unskilled (simple) and skilled (qualified) labour. Skilled labour costs more to produce than unskilled labour, and can be more productive. Generally Marx assumed that—irrespective of the price for which it is sold—skilled labour power had a higher value (it costs more to produce, in money, time, energy and resources), and that skilled work could produce a product with a higher value in the same amount of time, compared to unskilled labour. This was reflected in a skill hierarchy, and a hierarchy of wage-levels. In this sense, Friedrich Engels comments in Anti-Duhring:

Marx believed that the capitalist mode of production would over time replace people with machines, and encourage the easy replacement of one worker by another, and thus that most labour would tend to reduce to an average skill level and standardized norms of work effort. However he provided no specific calculus by which the value of skilled work could be expressed as a multiple of unskilled work, nor a theory of what regulates the valuation of skill differences. This has led to some theoretical debate among Marxian economists, but no definitive solution has yet been given. In the first volume of Das Kapital Marx had declared his intention to write a special study of the forms of labour-compensation, but he never did so. In contemporary society, a division is emerging between creative, skilled and specialized jobs attracting extraordinarily large salaries, and routine jobs paying very low salaries, where the enormous differences in pay rates are difficult to explain. 

The economist Anwar Shaikh from the New School for Social Research has analyzed input-output data, wage data and labour data for the US economy, to create an empirically testable theory of the market valuation of skill differences. The counterargument is, that the valuation of skills depends to a great extent on the balance of class forces between the rich educated class, and the "lower-skilled" working class. The rent-seeking educated class, on this view, can often raise its income far beyond the real worth of its work, if its specialist skills happen to be in short supply or in demand, or if they are hired through the "old boy" networks. That is to say, to an extent, the assumed skill level of the employee may be more imaginary, than real; it all depends on how skills, experience and qualifications are defined and valued. Skilled labour may be over-valued and unskilled labour under-valued at the same time.

The conservative US journalist David Brooks, citing Oren Cass, highlighted in a 2018 op-ed that:

The conservative Friedman Foundation noted that, although from 1950 to 2009 the total staffing at US public schools grew four times faster than the increase in students, scholastic achievement did not increase. While the number of teachers increased two and a half times faster, the number of administrators, teaching assistants and other staff grew seven times faster than the increase in students – i.e., almost three times as fast as the increase in teachers. To solve this problem, the Foundation proposed a more market-oriented approach, with more financial incentives and penalties. In 2018, the average student loan debt for US college graduates stood at $39,400 per graduate, up six percent from the previous year. Some 44 million Americans at that time owed $1.48 trillion+ in student loan debt, the bulk of which cannot be discharged through declaring bankruptcy.

Criticism
Marx did not think there was anything particularly mysterious about the fact that people valued products because they have to spend time working to produce them, or to buy them. However, academics have made many objections to his idea. The conceptual issues associated with the idea of abstract labour have been one of the main reasons why many economists abandoned the labour theory of value. It may be that the problems have never been resolved because they have been approached far too abstractly, using conceptual distinctions not really adequate for the purpose.

Without referring explicitly to Marx's work on the labour theory of value of David Ricardo, the marginal utility theorist William Stanley Jevons clearly stated the main criticism of the concept of abstract labour in his 1871 treatise:

Response to these Criticisms 
Replying to this type of criticism, the Russian Marxist Isaak Illich Rubin argued that the concept of abstract labour was really much more complex than it seemed at first sight. He distinguished between "physically equal" labour; labour which is "socially equated" by means of consensual social evaluation or comparison; and labour efforts equated via the exchange of products using money as a universal equivalent.

To these three aspects we could add at least five others, which are also mentioned by Marx:

the existence of normal labour-averages applying to different work tasks, which function as "labour norms" in any society; 
the gradation of many different labour efforts along one general, hierarchical dimension of worth, for the purpose of compensation; 
the universal exchangeability of labour efforts themselves, in a developed labour market; 
the general mobility of labour from one job or worksite to another; and 
the ability of the same workers to do all kinds of different jobs.

Some further aspects of the concept of abstract labour are provided by Marxian anthropologist Lawrence Krader and the mathematician Ulrich Krause. Possibly, these conceptual issues can be resolved, through a better empirical appreciation of the political economy of education, skills and the labour market.

Recent discussion

In his book Crack Capitalism, John Holloway considers abstract labour as the most radical foundational category of Marx's theory, and therefore he recommends the struggle against abstract labour as the centrepiece of the political struggle against capitalism.

The British computer scientist Paul Cockshott in 2013 wrote a piece critical of the German Marxist academic Michael Heinrich who, Cockshott argued, wrongly reinterpreted the concept of abstract labour so that it is no longer a scientifically testable concept.

See also
Abstraction
Critique of political economy
Exchange value
Labour power
Labour theory of value
Law of value
Socially necessary labour time
Value-form
Working time

References

Marxian economics
Theory of value (economics)
Labour economics
Labor studies
Abstraction
Marxian critique of political economy